The Grammy Award for Best Male Rock Vocal Performance was a Grammy Award presented to male recording artists for works (songs or albums) containing quality vocal performances in the rock music genre. Originally called the Grammy Award for Best Rock Vocal Performance, Male, the award was first presented to Bob Dylan in 1980. Beginning with the 1995 ceremony, the name of the award was changed to Best Male Rock Vocal Performance. However, in 1988, 1992, 1994, and since 2005, this category was combined with the Grammy Award for Best Female Rock Vocal Performance and presented in a genderless category known as Best Rock Vocal Performance, Solo. The solo category was later renamed to Best Solo Rock Vocal Performance beginning in 2005. This fusion has been criticized, especially when females are not nominated under the solo category. The Academy has cited a lack of eligible recordings in the female rock category as the reason for the mergers. While the award has not been presented since the category merge in 2005, an official confirmation of its retirement has not been announced.

Lenny Kravitz holds the record for the most wins in this category, with a total of four consecutive wins from 1999 to 2002. Bruce Springsteen has been presented the award three times, and two-time winners include Eric Clapton, Bob Dylan, Don Henley, and Robert Palmer. Since its inception, American artists have been presented with the award more than any other nationality, though it has been presented to musicians from the United Kingdom four times, from Australia once, and from South Africa once.

Recipients

 Each year is linked to the article about the Grammy Awards held that year.
 Award was combined with the Best Female Rock Vocal Performance category and presented in a genderless category known as Best Rock Vocal Performance, Solo.

See also

 American rock

References

General
  Note: User must select the "Rock" category as the genre under the search feature.
 

Specific

External links
Official site of the Grammy Awards

 
1980 establishments in the United States
2004 disestablishments in the United States
Awards disestablished in 2004
Awards established in 1980
Male Rock Vocal Performance